Troy Nixey (born 12 April, 1972) is a Canadian comic book artist and film director.

Comic books
Nixey has written and illustrated for comic books such as Neil Gaiman's Only the End of the World Again, Harley Quinn, and The Matrix Comics.

Film
After submitting his 2007 short Latchkey's Lament to filmmaker Guillermo del Toro looking for guidance and feedback, Nixey received an offer to direct his first full-length film, Don't Be Afraid of the Dark, a remake of a 1973 ABC made-for-television horror film that originally starred Kim Darby. The 2011 version starred Guy Pearce, Katie Holmes, and Bailee Madison.

References

External links
 Interview with Troy Nixey, Cinematic Happenings Under Development, October 5, 2007
 

1972 births
Living people
Artists from Alberta
Film directors from Alberta
Canadian comics writers
Canadian comics artists
Writers from Lethbridge